Grandview High School may refer to:

Grandview High School (Aurora, Colorado)
Grandview High School (Grandview, Missouri) in Grandview, Missouri
Grandview High School (Morrisville, Pennsylvania) in Morrisville, Bucks County, Pennsylvania
Grandview High School (Texas) in Grandview, Texas
Grandview High School (Ware, Missouri) in Ware, Missouri
Grandview High School (Washington) in Grandview, Washington
Grandview Heights High School (Columbus, Ohio)